L'Armonia Sonora is a Netherlands early music group led by the gambist Mieneke van der Velden.

The ensemble's first three releases appeared on the Ramée label were critically well received by BBC Music Magazine and Gramophone Magazine.

Discography
J. S. Bach Da Gamba - a volume of Bach gamba works, Ramée
De Profundia - German Sacred Cantatas  Vol.1 with Peter Kooij Ramée
Harmoniae Sacrae - German Sacred Cantatas Vol.2 with Hana Blažíková and Peter Kooij Ramée

References

External links
 Website

Early music groups